Mikhail Grigoryevich Pavlov (Russian Михаил Григорьевич Павлов) ( – ) was a Russian academic, largely responsible for spreading the philosophical ideas of the Naturphilosophie of Schelling in Russia. He was a professor at Moscow University.

He graduated from Moscow University in 1815. After a doctorate in medicine, and two years travelling in Europe to study science, he was given a chair in Moscow in 1821, in Agriculture, Mineralogy and Forestry. Subsequently he wrote textbooks in agriculture and chemistry, and lobbied for changed agricultural practices.Schelling appears as a kind of absentee grand master of a new higher order. The most popular university lecturer of the period, Professor Pavlov, was master of ceremonies, greeting students at the door of his lecture hall with his famous question: "You want to know about nature, but what is nature and what is knowledge?"

Notes

References
Brockhaus and Efron biography (in Russian)
krugosvet.ru bio (in Russian)
Moscow University page, with picture (in Russian)

1792 births
1840 deaths
19th-century scientists from the Russian Empire